The molecular formula C14H18N2O2 may refer to:

 O-Acetylpsilocin
 GR-196,429
 Nefiracetam
 Sunifiram

Molecular formulas